Tha Faek is a tambon (sub-district) of Nam Pat District, in Uttaradit Province, Thailand. In 2014 it had a population of 4,434 people.

History
The sub-district originally was part of Tha Pla District. With the creation of the Sirikit Dam in 1972, the sub-district has become separated from the central part of Tha Pla District. Effective 14 February 2015, the sub-district was reassigned to Nam Pat District to make the authorities easier to reach for the local residents.

Administration
The sub-district is divided into nine administrative villages.

The entire sub-district is covered by the Tha Faek sub-district administrative organization (องค์การบริหารส่วนตำบลท่าแฝก) as the local government unit, established in 1997.

References

External links
ThaiTambon.com on Tha Faek
http://thafak.org/ Tha Faek TAO

Tambon of Uttaradit province
Populated places in Uttaradit province